Aruko Sports Brasil, known as Aruko, is a Brazilian football club based in Maringá, Paraná. Founded in 2020, the club plays in the Campeonato Paranaense.

History
The club ended the 2021 Série Bronze as champions, achieving promotion to the Campeonato Paranaense Série Prata.

In the 2022 Série Prata, Aruko reached the finals and achieved promotion to the 2023 Campeonato Paranaense, but lost the finals to Foz do Iguaçu.

Honours
 Campeonato Paranaense Série Prata:
 Runner-up (1): 2022

 Campeonato Paranaense Série Bronze:
 Winners (1): 2021

References

Association football clubs established in 2020
Football clubs in Paraná (state)
2020 establishments in Brazil